Francis de Zulueta, FBA (born Francisco Maria José de Zulueta, 12 September 1878 – 16 January 1958) was the Regius Professor of Civil Law at the University of Oxford from 1919 until 1948.

Biography 
The son of Pedro Juan de Zulueta, Count of Torre Díaz), a Spanish diplomat, by his wife Laura, daughter of Sir Justin Sheil and his wife Mary  Leonora Woulfe, de Zulueta was educated at Beaumont College, The Oratory School and New College, Oxford, where he took Firsts in classical moderations (1899), literae humaniores (1901), and jurisprudence (1902). He was elected to a prize fellowship at Merton College, Oxford, in October 1902, and won the Vinerian Scholarship the following year. He was called to the bar by Lincoln's Inn in 1904. He subsequently returned to Oxford as a fellow of New College, Oxford, and of All Souls College, Oxford; he was made an Honorary Fellow of Merton College in 1937.

On the outbreak of World War I, de Zulueta, who regarded himself as British rather than Spanish, was naturalized a British subject, and was commissioned into the Worcestershire Regiment, reaching the rank of captain. In 1919, he was appointed Regius Professor of Civil Law at All Souls, becoming the first Roman Catholic Regius Professor since the Reformation.

He was a leading Catholic figure at Oxford for many years and the first Catholic Regius Professor since the Reformation, befriending Tolkien amongst others with whom he debated the nature of good and evil prior to The Lord of the Rings. He was a cousin of Cardinal Merry del Val (Secretary of State under Pope Pius XI). His son Sir Philip de Zulueta became the Foreign Office representative at 10 Downing Street, principally under Harold Macmillan, and his grandson, also Francis, is a leading investment professional in insurance in the City of London and a Knight of Malta.

De Zulueta is an ancient Catholic Basque family from the Pamplona region of Northern Spain, tracing ancestry back at least 700 years and connected to a number of senior Spanish titles including the Marquis de Merry del Val and Conde de Torre Díaz (a title awarded by Isabella II of Spain in 1846). This part of the family moved to the UK in the early C19th co-founding the P&O shipping company and establishing a bank, Zulueta & Co. in the City of London. An ancestor, Pedro José de Zulueta, was in 1841 tried for slave trading in association with Pedro Blanco (slave trader), but acquitted.

A number of direct descendants still successfully operate in the City of London. Francis's brother Pedro was a composer of operettas, song, and waltzes.

Bibliography
Books
Patronage in the Later Empire
The Liber Pauperum of Vacarius
The Roman Law of Sale
''Institutes of Gaius'

References

Alumni of New College, Oxford
Fellows of New College, Oxford
Fellows of Merton College, Oxford
Fellows of All Souls College, Oxford
1878 births
1958 deaths
British barristers
British people of Basque descent
English people of Spanish descent
English Roman Catholics
Fellows of the British Academy
Legal historians
Members of Lincoln's Inn
People educated at Beaumont College
People educated at The Oratory School
Regius Professors of Civil Law (University of Oxford)
Scholars of Roman law
Worcestershire Regiment officers